Salvator mundi is an oil on panel painting by Andrea Previtali, executed in 1519, now in the National Gallery, London, to which it was left in 1910. The work was produced in Bergamo.

References

Bibliography
  Antonia Abbatista Finocchiaro, La pittura bergamasca nella prima decina del cinquecento, La Rivista di Bergamo, 2001.

Paintings by Andrea Previtali
Paintings depicting Jesus
1519 paintings
Collections of the National Gallery, London